1976 Women's Nordic Football Championship was the third edition of the Women's Nordic Football Championship tournament. It was held from 9 July to 11 July in Borås, Fristad and Öxabäck in Sweden.

Standings

Results

Goalscorers 
2 goals
  Ann Jansson

1 goal
  Annette Frederiksen
  Marketta Hartikka
  Anne Grete Holst
  Karin Åhman
  Mona Åhman

Sources 
Nordic Championships (Women) 1976 Rec.Sport.Soccer Statistics Foundation
Landsholdsdatabasen Danish Football Association
Lautela, Yrjö & Wallén, Göran: Rakas jalkapallo — Sata vuotta suomalaista jalkapalloa, p. 418. Football Association of Finland / Teos Publishing 2007. .

Women's Nordic Football Championship
1976–77 in European football
1976 in women's association football
1976
1976 in Finnish football
1976 in Swedish football
1976 in Danish football
July 1976 sports events in Europe
1976 in Swedish women's sport